Ádria Rocha Santos (born 11 August 1974) is a retired Paralympic sprinter from Brazil. Born nearly blind, she completely lost her vision by 1994. She competed in category T11 events at six consecutive Paralympics from 1988 to 2008 and won at least one medal on each occasion. She was a final torch bearer at the 2016 Summer Paralympics opening ceremony.

In 2003 Santos married Rafael, a former pole vaulter who served as her guide and coach. The couple has a daughter.

References

External links 

 

1974 births
Living people
Paralympic athletes of Brazil
Athletes (track and field) at the 1988 Summer Paralympics
Athletes (track and field) at the 1992 Summer Paralympics
Athletes (track and field) at the 1996 Summer Paralympics
Athletes (track and field) at the 2000 Summer Paralympics
Athletes (track and field) at the 2004 Summer Paralympics
Athletes (track and field) at the 2008 Summer Paralympics
Paralympic gold medalists for Brazil
Paralympic silver medalists for Brazil
Paralympic bronze medalists for Brazil
Brazilian female sprinters
Medalists at the 1988 Summer Paralympics
Medalists at the 1992 Summer Paralympics
Medalists at the 1996 Summer Paralympics
Medalists at the 2000 Summer Paralympics
Medalists at the 2004 Summer Paralympics
Medalists at the 2008 Summer Paralympics
Paralympic medalists in athletics (track and field)
Medalists at the 2007 Parapan American Games
21st-century Brazilian women
20th-century Brazilian women
Visually impaired sprinters
Paralympic sprinters